Badia may refer to:

Places
 Badia, Bangladesh, a village in Chandpur District
 Val Badia, a valley in South Tyrol, Italy
 Badia, South Tyrol, a municipality in South Tyrol
 Badia, Castiglione del Lago, a frazione of Castiglione del Lago, Perugia, Italy
 Badia, Mali, a commune in the Cercle of Kita
 Badia (region), a semi-arid region of Syria and Jordan

People
 Badia (surname)
 Badia Masabni (1892–1974), Syrian belly dancer, singer, actress, night club owner and businesswoman considered the developer of modern belly dancing
 Badia Skalli (born 1944), Moroccan politician

Other uses
 Badia (spider), a genus of spiders in the family Palpimanidae

See also

 Italy:
 , an abbey in Tuscany
 Badia a Elmi, a village in the province of Siena
 Badia Calavena, a municipality in the province of Verona
 Badia di Passignano, an historic Benedictine abbey near Florence
 Badia Fiorentina, an abbey and church in Florence
 Badia Pavese, a municipality in the province of Pavia
 Badia Polesine, a municipality in the province of Rovigo
 Badia Tedalda, a municipality in the province of Arezzo
 Spain:
 Badia del Vallès, a municipality
 Badiya, an upcoming video game
 Princess Badiya bint Hassan (born 1974), Jordanian princess
 Badya, a Russian river
Abbadia (disambiguation)
Abbadie (disambiguation)

Feminine given names